The Luther Brooks House is a historic house located at 34 Kirkland Street in Cambridge, Massachusetts.

Description and history 
The -story wood-frame house was built in 1840 by Oliver Hastings. It retained a traditional entry centered on the long side of the house, while it was oriented with its gable to the street in the Greek Revival style. A two-story ell at the rear of the house is probably original, and the house was further extended with a single story addition on its east side.

The house was listed on the National Register of Historic Places on September 12, 1986.

See also
Joseph Lovering House, 38 Kirkland Street, also a Hastings design
Church of the New Jerusalem (Cambridge, Massachusetts), also adjacent
National Register of Historic Places listings in Cambridge, Massachusetts

References

Houses completed in 1840
Houses on the National Register of Historic Places in Cambridge, Massachusetts
Greek Revival houses in Massachusetts